Rose Kerrigan (11 February 1903 – 10 July 1995) was a member of the Communist Party of Great Britain

Early life
Rose Klasko was born in Dublin, Ireland in 1903. Her Jewish parents were born in Russia, and moved to Glasgow via Dublin. Her father worked as a tailor and had socialist, anti-war, political views. He supported the cause of the Suffragettes.

Rose attended the Stow Practice Normal School, which was on the site of the old Stow College in Cowcaddens, Glasgow. She then attended the Hebrew School in Garnethill. She attended the Socialist Sunday School in Glasgow and was involved in the Glasgow rent strikes 1915. She was involved in the anti-war movement in World War I and World War II, and was sacked from her first job for speaking out against the war.   She was influenced by many activists during her political life, including James Maxton, Philip Snowden, Ethel Snowden, Thomas Hastie Bell, and Helen Crawfurd.

Later life
Rose joined the Communist Party of Great Britain in 1923. She married Peter Kerrigan, who was also a member, in 1926. Her husband was a representative to the Comintern, and became a political commissar during the Spanish Civil War. Rose raised money for the cause.

References

1903 births
1995 deaths
British people of the Spanish Civil War
British Jews
Politicians from Glasgow
Red Clydeside
Scottish communists
Women in the Spanish Civil War